Sam Groth was the defending champion, having won the event in 2014 in Rimouski, but decided not to participate this year.

John-Patrick Smith won the title, defeating Frank Dancevic 6–7(11–13), 7–6(7–3), 7–5 in the final.

Seeds

Draw

Finals

Top half

Bottom half

References
Main Draw
Qualifying Draw

Challenger Banque Nationale de Drummondville
Challenger de Drummondville